Manharlal Pranlal Thakkar or M. P. Thakkar (born 4 November 1923, date of death unknown) was an Indian judge who was a Justice of the Supreme Court of India, and Chairman of Twelfth Law Commission of India.

Early life
Thakkar was born in Burma, British India in 1923. He studied in National High School, Basavanagudi and B.E.T. High School at Rangoon. He passed LL.B from Sir L.A. Shah Law College of Ahmedabad. After the enrollment he started practice in the Indian High Courts in 1948.

Career
Thakkar practised on Civil, Criminal, Income-Tax, Industrial Disputes and Company matters before the then Saurashtra High Court at Rajkot and Bombay High Court. He worked in the Gujarat High Court since 1960 to 1963. He was appointed the Judge in City Civil and Sessions Court on 23 January 1963. Thakkar also served as Special Judge and Additional Judge in the Gujarat High Court. He became the Permanent Judge of the same High Court on 27 November 1973. Thakkar was elevated to the post of Chief Justice, Gujarat High Court on 20 August 1981. He was appointed a Justice of the Supreme Court of India in March 1983. He was the head of the investigating Thakkar Commission for the Assassination of Indira Gandhi.

Later life
After his retirement, Justice Thakkar was appointed Chairman of Twelfth Law Commission of India in 1988. Thakkar is deceased.

References

1923 births
Year of death missing
20th-century Indian judges
20th-century Indian lawyers
21st-century Indian judges
21st-century Indian lawyers
Chief Justices of the Gujarat High Court
Gujarat University alumni
Indian expatriates in British Burma
Judges of the Gujarat High Court
Justices of the Supreme Court of India